"Gandhi Mate, Gandhi" is a single by British rock band Enter Shikari from their third studio album "A Flash Flood of Colour". The single was released on 6 December 2011 as a digital download. The song charted at number 112 in the UK Singles Chart and number 3 on the UK Rock Chart.

Track listings
Digital download
 "Gandhi Mate, Gandhi" – 4:26

Chart performance

Release history

References

2011 singles
Enter Shikari songs
Dubstep songs
Wikipedia requested audio of songs
2011 songs